World Wide Pictures is a film, television and multimedia production company established in 1935. Its origins were in the British Documentary Movement founded by John Grierson in the 1930s, producing propaganda and information films for the government during World War II. After the war, it specialised in sponsored films, advertisements, industrial and promotional films. Two early successes were The Undefeated (1950), made to promote state welfare services available to disabled ex-servicemen, and David (1951), commissioned to promote Wales at the Festival of Britain. The company remains active making advertisements, corporate videos and multimedia productions.

External links 
World Wide Pictures
Entry in the British Film Institute's SIFT database

Film production companies of the United Kingdom
World Wide